Liu Hailong (Chinese: 柳海龙, pinyin: Liǔ Hǎilóng, born May 30, 1981 in Shandong Province) is a Chinese Sanda kickboxer. Liu's rise to fame came in 2000 in the inaugural King of Sanda tournament. Liu not only won his weight class, but went on to win a grueling one-night open weight round robin tournament against much bigger fighters as well,  giving him the title Sanda "King of Kings". Exciting and charismatic, Liu is almost certainly China's most recognized combat athlete.

At the 2002 Sanshou World Cup in Macau, Liu faced Muslim Salihov in a competition and beat him on points to win the 80 kg division gold medal. Salihov is a highly accomplished Russian Sanshou fighter who would later become a King of Sanda himself. Some fight observers believe Salihov won the closely contested match.

In 2003, Liu faced a fellow King of Sanda in Yuan Yubao in the promotion's first "superfight", defeating him soundly by decision to earn the title of "Super King of Sanda".

In December 2003, Liu scored a unanimous decision over Eduardo Fujihara to claim the IKF Sanshou World Championship. Other Chinese fighters who participated in that event include Bao Li Gao.

At the World Sanda Kings tournament in 2003 there was a challenge issued by well-known American Sanshou fighter Cung Le to Liu Hailong for a ``superfight`` to decide who was the best in the world. However the highly anticipated matchup never materialized between the two sides.

After an injury in 2005, Liu retired from the sport. In 2009, he made a comeback facing and KOing Japanese fighter Iga Koji.

Championships and awards

Chinese Sanda King Tournament
2003 Chinese Sanda King of Super Championship
2003 Chinese Sanda King Championship
2002 Chinese Sanda King of Super Championship
2000 Chinese Sanda King Championship
IKF Sanshou World Championships
IKF Sanshou World Championships -80 kg Championship
World Wushu Championships
2003 World Wushu Championships Gold Medalist 
Sanda World Cup
2004 Sanda World Cup Gold Medalist 
2002 Sanda World Cup Gold Medalist 
Chinese Sanda Championships	
2004 Chinese Sanda Championships -80 kg Championship
2003 Chinese Sanda Champion Championships -80 kg Championship
2002 Chinese Sanda Championships -80 kg Championship
2001 The 9th National Games Sanda -75 kg Championship
2000 Chinese Sanda Championships -75 kg Championship
2000 Chinese Sanda Group Championships 75–80 kg Championship

Sanda record

|-
|- bgcolor="#CCFFCC"
| 2003-12 || Win || align=left| Eduardo Fujihara || IKF Sanshou || China || Decision (Unanimous) || 3 || 3:00
|-
! style=background:white colspan=9 |
|- bgcolor="#CCFFCC"
| 2003-11-07 || Win || align=left| Mohamed Selit ||  7th IWUF Wushu World Championship, Finals || Macau, China || Decision (Unanimous) || 3 || 3:00
|-
! style=background:white colspan=9 |
|- bgcolor="#CCFFCC"
| 2003-11-05 || Win || align=left| Muslim Salikhov ||  7th IWUF Wushu World Championship, 1/8 Finals || Macau, China || Decision (Unanimous) || 3 || 3:00
|- bgcolor="#CCFFCC"
| 2003-|| Win || align=left| Robert Kaennorasing ||  || Guangzhou, China || Decision || 5 || 3:00
|-

Filmography
 He-Man (2011)
 All Men Are Brothers (TV series) (2011)
 Police Story 2013 (2013)

Notes

External links
柳海龙 (Liu Hailong)

Living people
1981 births
Chinese male kickboxers
Light heavyweight kickboxers
Chinese sanshou practitioners
Sportspeople from Shandong